"Paper Doll" is a song by the British-American band Fleetwood Mac. It was also released as a single exclusively in North America with "The Chain" as its B-side. The song's chord progression was written by Rick Vito and John Heron and the melody and lyrics were composed by Stevie Nicks. While "Paper Doll" achieved only minor success in the United States, it reached the top ten in Canada, peaking at number nine in February 1993.

Background
"Paper Doll" was recorded in 1988 and was slated to appear on the 1988 Greatest Hits album. Mick Fleetwood was unhappy with the song, so it was pulled in favor of "No Questions Asked". By the time the band was assembling their 1992 box set 25 Years – The Chain, Fleetwood had warmed up to "Paper Doll" and agreed to add the song to the track list. "Paper Doll" also appeared on The Very Best of Fleetwood Mac.

Lindsey Buckingham was no longer a member of the band during the song's recording, although he did contribute some guitar and vocal work for the song.

Personnel
Stevie Nicks – lead vocals
Billy Burnette – guitars, backing vocals
Rick Vito – guitars, backing vocals
Christine McVie – keyboards
John McVie – bass guitar
Mick Fleetwood – drums, timbales, güira, congas, tambourine
Lindsey Buckingham – backing vocals, additional guitar

Charts

Weekly charts

Year-end charts

References

1992 singles
Fleetwood Mac songs
Song recordings produced by Richard Dashut
1988 songs
Songs written by Stevie Nicks
Warner Records singles
Songs written by Rick Vito